was a Japanese speed skater. He competed in two events at the 1952 Winter Olympics.

References

1925 births
1992 deaths
Japanese male speed skaters
Olympic speed skaters of Japan
Speed skaters at the 1952 Winter Olympics
Sportspeople from Miyagi Prefecture